Ardonsky District (Ærydony rajon) is an administrative and municipal district (raion), one of the eight in the Republic of North Ossetia–Alania, Russia. It is located in the center of the republic. Its administrative center is the town of Ardon. Population:  28,831 (2002 Census);  The population of Ardon accounts for 61.2% of the district's total population.

Notable residents 

Alan Koroyev (born 1998 in Ardon), football player

References

Notes

Sources

Districts of North Ossetia–Alania